Mahyar Jabbari (born December 12, 1998) is an Iranian footballer who plays as a defender who currently plays for Iranian club Saipa in the Persian Gulf Pro League.

Club career

Saipa
He made his debut for Saipa in 4th fixtures of 2019–20 Iran Pro League against Pars Jam. After that in October 2019, he played against two others Iranian football clubs Esteghlal and Sepahan.

References

1998 births
Living people
Association football defenders
Iranian footballers
Saipa F.C. players